The 1901 Missouri Tigers football team was an American football team that represented the University of Missouri as an independent during the 1901 college football season. The team compiled a 1-6-1 record and was outscored by its opponents by a combined total of 155 to 30. Fred W. Murphy was the head coach for the second and final season. The team played its home games at Rollins Field in Columbia, Missouri.

Schedule

References

Missouri
Missouri Tigers football seasons
Missouri Tigers football